Midtown (formerly Midtown Plaza) is a shopping mall in Saskatoon, Saskatchewan, Canada, located in the Central Business District neighbourhood. The main anchor store is Hudson's Bay and the shopping centre has a total store count of 154 stores. The mall was built on the former site of the city's main railway station as part of a major inner city redevelopment project in the 1960s that also saw construction of a freeway, the Senator Sid Buckwold Bridge, TCU Place (formerly Centennial Auditorium) - an arts-convention complex - and a new facility for the city's YMCA. 

The mall officially opened with 51 stores and services; as well as an extensive underground parking garage; on July 30, 1970. One of its anchor tenants, Simpsons-Sears (Sears Canada), opened for business in 1968, more than a year ahead of the rest of the mall, but closed January 2018. Eaton's was the mall's second anchor until that chain went out of business in the holiday season of 1999; The Bay (later branded Hudson's Bay) subsequently relocated to the mall from its corner of 2nd Avenue & 23rd Street standalone location. From its opening until its late-1980s renovation, the mall had a corridor connecting directly to the auditorium, which was usually utilized as an exit from the facility; there was also a corridor connecting the auditorium to the mall's parking garage. One early tenant of the mall was Midtown Cinema, the city's first mall-based movie theatre; it later split into two cinemas to become Saskatoon's first "multiplex"; the theatre closed in the spring of 2000 and its space was used for temporary retail and other exhibitions before being reallocated to other stores and parking.

Another "day one" retailer was a franchise of the Dominion grocery store chain, which operated in the mall until the chain pulled out of Saskatoon in the late 1980s; after a few years of short-term uses (including housing its popular Eaton's-sponsored Christmas lights display), the mall redeveloped the former Dominion store into a food court.

The mall was originally one storey. By 1990, a second storey was added and the façade was altered to mimic the original 1900s railway station. This reconstruction cost . Soon after, Saskatoon's first (and, to date) only Toys "R" Us store opened on a standalone "big-box" location in 1991 on the mall's southern parking lot; although not physically connected to the mall, it is considered part of the shopping centre. 

Also part of the Midtown complex is CN Towers – now "Midtown Tower" – an office block that was for most of the 1970s the tallest office building in Saskatoon. From the early 1970s until the early 2000s, the fifth floor of the office block housed the studios of the local CBC Television owned-and-operated station CBKST. A small "boutique" mall, Midtown Village, was developed in the late 1970s at the corner of 20th Street and Idylwyld Drive; initially a separate development from Midtown Plaza, it briefly came under the same ownership as the larger mall in the 1990s and was branded as part of Midtown Plaza for a time, before being demolished for additional parking.

From 1993 to 2005, the mall owned and displayed Gordie Howe statue at the southwest corner of 1st Avenue South and 20th Street East. It was relocated to the SaskTel Centre in 2005.

Following the closure of the Sears Canada chain in winter of 2018, the mall began to redevelop the store's space into a new wing with a re-located food court, which opened on July 25, 2019. In November 2018, it was announced that the previous main-floor food court area would be redeveloped into an MEC, as its first location in the province. It was originally projected to open in May 2020, but was delayed to late-2021 due to the COVID-19 pandemic and other factors. The fate of the future store was also questioned in September 2020, when MEC announced that it would be privatized and sold to American investment firm Kingswood Capital Management. An H&M store opened in the mall in December 2020.

Anchor Tenants
Hudson’s Bay formally The Bay
Zellers Opening within Hudson’s Bay spring 2023
Sport Check located on the second level 
H&M
Dollarama located on the second level in Midtown Common 
Toys “R” Us Canada, (Stand Alone Store) located on the south lot across 20th Street 
Shoppers Drug Mart located on the ground floor on the south end of the mall

Former Anchor Tenants
Sears Canada 1968-2018
Eaton’s 1970-1999
Midtown Theatre, Closed In 2000

See also
 List of shopping malls in Saskatoon

References

External links
 
 Saskatoon Retail Survey

Shopping malls in Saskatchewan
Shopping malls established in 1968
Buildings and structures in Saskatoon
Terminating vistas in Canada
Tourist attractions in Saskatoon
1968 establishments in Saskatchewan